Jamiah Darul Uloom Zahedan is the largest and highest seat of Deobandis in Iran. The Jamiah was founded by Abdolazeez, son of Mojahid Sheikh Abdollah.

The Jamiah started its education activities in 1971 for the first time along with around 60 to 80 students and only 6 teachers in the new building of Darul Uloom on Khayyam Road. A good number of students studying at Jamiah Darul Uloom Zahedan.

Education pattern

The Jamiah has divided its education system into seven stages. These stages are given below along with years each stage requires:

Primary Stage: two years
Junior Stage: two years
General Secondary Stage: two years
Special Courses Stage: two years
Higher Level (BA) Stage: four years
Alameya (MA) Stage: two years
Specialization in Fiqh (Islamic jurisprudence): two years

The total term of study besides having primary certificate of any government school, including two-year of specialization, is 16 years.

Department and administrative divisions

The Jamiah has following departments and divisions:

Dar-ul-Iftaa, Specialization in Islamic Jurisprudence, Tafseer and Da'wah, Darulqadha and Tahkeem, Girls School, Hefz-e-Quran section, Tajweed section, Da'wat and guidance centre, Office for Students' Affairs, Central Library, Translation and Research Centre, Publication, Fiqh Academy of Ahlus-Sunnah, Institute of Arabic Language and Islamic Studies, Union of Islamic schools of Balochistan, SunniOnline Website, Medical Centre, Office for Islamic Institutes, etc.

Grand Makki Mosque in Zahedan, Iran, the largest mosque of the Sunnis in Iran situated next to the Seminary.

Publication

The Jamiah is publishing the Neday Islam Magazine. The Jamiah has also published many articles.

Dozens of Islamic books have been published by Darululoom Zahedan via Siddiqi Publicationa and its Translation & Research Centre in Persian and Arabic languages, mostly.

See also

 Madrasah
 Deobandi
 Darul Uloom Deoband
 Darul Uloom Karachi
 Darul Uloom London
 Al-Jamiatul Ahlia Darul Ulum Moinul Islam
 Jamia Uloom ul Islamia

References

External links
  
 
 
 

Islamic universities and colleges in Iran
Deobandi Islamic universities and colleges
Populated places in Sistan and Baluchestan Province
Sistan and Baluchestan Province
Zahedan